BArch may refer to:

 Bundesarchiv (BArch), the German Federal Archives
 Bachelor of Architecture (B.Arch)

See also
 Barch (surname)